Sami Wikström (born August 8, 1967) is a Finnish former ice hockey left winger.

Wikström played the majority of his career with Reipas, playing in the SM-liiga for Hockey Reipas between 1990 and 1992 and its successor Reipas Lahti between 1992 and 1994.

References

External links

1967 births
Living people
HC Alleghe players
Brest Albatros Hockey players
Drakkars de Caen players
Finnish ice hockey left wingers
Heerenveen Flyers players
Herning Blue Fox players
Lahti Pelicans players
Ice hockey people from Helsinki